WBBZ-TV (channel 67) is an independent television station licensed to Springville, New York, United States, serving the Buffalo area. It is owned by ITV of Buffalo, a company controlled by former news photographer Philip A. Arno. WBBZ-TV's studios are located at the Eastern Hills Mall in the town of Clarence (in a census-designated place called Harris Hill), and its transmitter is located near Springville in the hills of southern Erie County.

History

Early years
The station was founded as WJTQ on March 12, 1993. Bill Smith, an amateur radio enthusiast, and his wife, Caroline Powley, daughter of late LPTV innovator John R. Powley, who built several full-service UHF television stations using economical "ham" radio equipment and surplus educational television "translator" transmitters, changed its call letters to WNGS (for "Buffalo wings") in May 1993.

WNGS initially broadcast on analog UHF channel 67. Although licensed as a full-power station, it transmitted its analog signal at low power with a northward directional pattern covering much of the Southtowns, but not reaching the city of Buffalo proper. Radiated power in the direction of Buffalo was limited due to a treaty with Canada that protected the coverage area of CHCH-TV-3, a Midland, Ontario-based rebroadcaster of Hamilton, Ontario–based independent station CHCH-TV (channel 11) that also operated on UHF channel 67. As a result, from the city of Buffalo northward, it was only available on cable or by satellite, and in certain places in the Southern Tier, it was not available at all.

The station began with an infomercial/home shopping format, but added general-entertainment barter talk shows, cartoons and low-budget sitcoms in 1997. WNGS became a UPN affiliate in April 1998, but lost the affiliation to WNLO (channel 23) in January 2003. Shortly afterward, WNGS dropped most of its entertainment programming in favor of infomercials. For most of its time as an independent station and UPN affiliate, WNGS operated from studios in West Valley, New York.

Olean, New York, low-powered station WONS-LP shared the UPN affiliation under a mutual agreement with WNGS until the network was picked up by WNLO, at which time, the station began carrying programming from The Sportsman Channel. At least one television listings provider (Decisionmark Corporation, then-owner of TitanTV which is now owned by Broadcast Interactive Media) had erroneously listed WONS-LP as a translator of WNGS. (As of 2018, that station is now a This TV affiliate under the call sign WVTT-CD.)

Equity and WKBW era
After Equity Broadcasting took ownership of the station, WNGS became an affiliate of Equity's Retro Television Network (RTN). During Equity's ownership, the station was operated by Granite Broadcasting, owner of ABC affiliate WKBW-TV (channel 7), under a local marketing agreement (LMA). As part of the agreement, WNGS was carried on WKBW's digital subchannel. Along with RTN programming, WNGS aired sports programming from WKBW-TV and various sports broadcasts.

Equity sold RTN to Luken Communications in 2008. Following a dispute between Equity and Luken, all of Equity's RTN affiliates, including WNGS, disaffiliated from the network on January 4, 2009. WNGS continued to carry other programs, such as sports and locally produced B-movie film showcase Off Beat Cinema. Later that month, WNGS switched its affiliation to This TV.

The RTN affiliation later moved to a digital subchannel of WGRZ, then to the pairing of low-power stations W30BW in Olean and WBXZ-LP, assuming they get their transmitter installed, in Buffalo.

Temporary shutdown and return
On April 16, 2009, as a result of its bankruptcy, Equity Media Holdings auctioned off 60 of its television stations. WNGS was sold to Daystar Television Network for a total of US$7.4 million. They already owned WDTB-LP in nearby Hamburg, along with six other full-service stations and nine LPTV and Class A stations . Also around this time, WNGS's agreement with WKBW-TV ended. The sale was approved by the Federal Communications Commission in August 2009. WNGS went off the air on June 12, 2009, after not being able to complete its transition to digital-only broadcasts on time, and remained silent for almost a year. Meanwhile, on May 14, 2010, Daystar filed to sell the station to ITV of Buffalo, LLC, a partnership owned by local TV personalities Philip Arno and Donald Angelo, for $2.75 million, with plans to program the station from Clarence, New York. Angelo later dropped his involvement in the station.

WNGS finally completed its digital transmitter and returned to the air in late May 2010, carrying programming from Daystar. The sale was completed on September 16, 2010; at that time, the station rejoined This TV.  However, as part of the deal, Daystar had to remain on WNGS in the form of a digital subchannel for 10 years, a deal which was previously made with KOCE-TV in the Los Angeles area as a compromise after Daystar was unable to purchase that station.

WNGS, formerly on a digital subchannel of WKBW-TV, had planned to launch its own digital signal on WKBW-TV's former analog channel allocation, channel 7, at the end of the 2009 digital transition.

By December 2008, both the ability of WNGS to transition to its own digital facilities and its ability to continue broadcasting were directly jeopardized as (according to a DTV status report by the station), "On December 8, 2008, the licensee's parent corporation filed a petition for bankruptcy relief under Chapter 11 of the federal bankruptcy code, case #4:08-BK-17646-M, U.S. district court for the district of Arkansas. This station must obtain post-petition financing and court approval before digital facilities may be constructed. The station will cease analogue broadcasting on June 12, 2009, regardless of whether digital facilities are operational by that date. The station will file authority to remain silent if so required by the FCC.

While the station had applied for an extension for a construction permit for its digital transmitter, it was unable to continue analog operations as it was not only a full-service station, but it also operated on a frequency which was to be reallocated for non-broadcast use at the end of the digital television transition. Further complicating matters was that Kitchener, Ontario's, CTV owned-and-operated station CKCO-TV, a station serving portions of southern Ontario with a signal that penetrates Western New York, was assigned the same channel 7 allocation by the Canadian Radio-television and Telecommunications Commission (CRTC) for its own digital signal. It should have applied to simulcast digitally before its analog channel 13 broadcasts end in August 2011, when that station would move digital broadcasts to channel 13.

Daystar's last-minute proposal to transmit from a broadcast tower used by WNYO-TV (channel 49) in Folsomdale, New York instead of using WKBW-TV's Colden tower was rejected due to WNYO-TV owner Sinclair Broadcast Group's last-minute decision to broadcast WNYO-TV on its lower power digital channel 34 from Grand Island, and receiving FCC approval to transfer its digital signal to a full-power channel 49 transmission from Folsomdale on June 12.

Because WNGS failed to begin digital broadcasts on channel 7 after June 12, 2009, local cable providers had an option to no longer carry the station despite WNGS' direct fiber connection to the providers from West Valley. As the Buffalo market stretches west to near Erie, Pennsylvania, east towards Rochester, New York, north towards Toronto, Canada, and several counties in northern Pennsylvania in an area with several varieties of terrain, pay television service is almost a requirement for optimum viewing in outlying areas. This resulted in the Buffalo–Hamilton–Toronto area having one of the highest pay-television penetration rates in the Northeast. Very few households watched the over-the-signals of many of the stations, resulting in serious trouble for WNGS if it were unable to continue maintaining its must-carry status. While Daystar's existing analog translator stations could maintain the station's service in the area, WDTB-LP only covered small portions of the city of Buffalo, far from providing market-wide coverage by any means.

On June 12, 2009, WNGS switched to a "nightlight" service, broadcasting only a still screen reading "WNGS has ceased operations as of June 12, 2009". Though it technically extended the broadcast life of the station, this was not allowed to continue any later than July 12, far too soon for a digital over-the-air signal to be ready. DirecTV customers in the Buffalo market stopped receiving WNGS on June 22, 2009, and on July 12 the analog transmitter was turned off, starting the clock on the station's requirement to build digital facilities by July 12, 2010, when the FCC could consider the license abandoned and delete it.

By March 2010, the station still had not returned to the air in any form. Time Warner Cable ended its hold on WNGS' channel 11 cable slot; WNLO was moved into that position and TWC's regional cable news channel YNN Buffalo was placed on channel 9, the former location of WNLO.

In late May 2010, WNGS began transmitting its digital signal on channel 7, a month before license deletion. It invoked must carry and returned to Time Warner Cable on channel 5 (a prime cable position that WNGS specifically lobbied to obtain) in November 2010. The station's website returned sometime in December 2010. After an appeal to the Federal Communications Commission, WBBZ-TV also invoked must-carry in Time Warner Cable's other Western New York service areas in November 2012; TWC had initially refused to carry WBBZ-TV in those markets, ostensibly because of signal quality issues. As of 2014, WBBZ-TV is still not available on the region's other cable provider, Atlantic Broadband/Cogeco, which covers portions of Cattaraugus County; McKean County, Pennsylvania; and southern Ontario (the last of which, being outside the United States, is not subject to must-carry rules).

Relaunch as WBBZ
WNGS changed its call sign to WBBZ-TV at 5:00 a.m. on August 1, 2011, as part of a planned drastic increase in the station's local programming. The This TV affiliation moved to a digital subchannel, while it began carrying MeTV on its main channel. WBBZ-TV struggled to find a studio location to house its operations. Arno had preferred to use the former Studio Arena Theater, but had been unable to secure a deal; he also passed on the Buffalo Central Terminal due to the building's state of disrepair. The Eastern Hills Mall, which holds the station's offices, originally rejected the plan to build a studio at the mall but later relented and allowed it to be constructed. By early 2012, the studio at the Eastern Hills Mall began construction; the first program was taped from there in June.

Personnel
WBBZ-TV hired former WKBW-TV sports director and general manager of the Empire Sports Network, Bob Koshinski as its executive in charge of production in 2012. He was promoted to vice president and general manager and served in those posts until resigning in January 2015; he continued to serve as a sports host through summer of that year. John DiSciullo, WKBW-TV's program director of three decades, was hired as executive in charge of production; he also serves as on-air host for local programs. Chris Musial, former general manager at WIVB-TV, was hired as a consultant (and was later promoted as Koshinski's replacement) in 2015. As of May 2013, the station employs fifteen people, not counting Arno.

Notable current staff
Andrew Dan-Jumbo — host of Talk with Your Mouth Full
Danny Neaverth — contributor (I've Been Thinking short-form segments)
Lauren Fix — automotive contributor

Notable former staff
John Murphy — co-host of Sportsnite on RTN11
Luke Tasker — sports reporter
Fred Jackson — co-host of The Fred Jackson Show (seasons 1–3)
Tom Torbjornsen — host of America's Car Show
Robert Woods — co-host of In the Zone (seasons 4–5)

Programming

Originally proposed local programming
Philip Arno is highly critical of the local news programming seen on WGRZ (channel 2), WIVB-TV (channel 4) and WKBW-TV and has no intention to develop a full news department as those stations have. He is nonetheless considering a daily newsmagazine, in the vein of AM Buffalo (which DiSciullo worked on for many years and occasionally hosted), with news, features and a meteorologist.

Local programming that Arno had announced in 2011 that he was seeking to add to the station included a morning show (which would have included local segments inside The Daily Buzz), a game show (what eventually became Bragging Rights!), a local late-night talk show with a local comedian as host, a local talk show in the mold of ABC's The View (Arno had mentioned = former Buffalo television personalities Susan Hunt and Susan Banks as potential hosts for the series, which eventually came to fruition as Daily Buzz 716), a show geared to the military, a local Battle of the Bands and a video game review show that is aimed at younger viewers. Also slated for the future were a sports talk show hosted by Sabres Hockey Network personalities Rob Ray and Danny Gare, "a weekly made-for-TV play produced in conjunction with a local theater company drawing on its actors and production crew," and a weekly Buffalo Bills postgame show (what eventually became The Fred Jackson Show and In the Zone). The ultimate goal is to produce four to six hours per day of local programming, although Arno acknowledges this may be too expensive and ambitious to achieve; he has suggested he would need to sell a stake in the station, at a significant premium, to fund such a project.

Regularly scheduled local programming

Local programming seen on WBBZ-TV includes the following regularly scheduled series:
The Karyn Reece Show, a paranormal program hosted by psychic Karyn Reece, has aired since July 7, 2017. Reece previously hosted Secrets from Beyond with hypnotist Robert Saviola, which aired from February through August 2013 (replacing The Fred Jackson Show in the off-season). The series was one of WBBZ-TV's most popular programs and was funded by charging admission to be in the audience and/or participate. On January 17, 2014, Arno announced the show had been canceled and would not return for a second season due to financial losses. Reece later moved to WGRZ and hosted 2 the Unknown on that channel for the rest of that year, then after two years off television returned to WBBZ with her current series; initially known as Psychic Encounters, by 2019 it had become an eponymous program. Since 2020, Reece has co-hosted the show with Alexa Zappia.
Polka Buzz, billed as "Buffalo's only dance show", debuted in fall 2015. It airs on Sundays and is hosted by Ron Dombrowski, longtime host of a daily polka radio show that is heard on WXRL and WECK. Created by Chris Musial and station Vice President of Sales Angelo Cicatello, both of whom are of partial Polish descent, the show attracts a regular entourage which appears at each taping, usually at Potts Banquet Hall in Cheektowaga; In 2021, following over a year of hiatus, it moved to an outdoor venue at Buffalo RiverWorks.
Good Deeds Buffalo debuted May 29, 2021 and is hosted by Jordan James.
Passionate Living debuted February 4, 2020 and is hosted by Catherine Miller.
Beat the Champ, a revival of the former WBEN-TV Van Miller-hosted ten-pin bowling series of the same name, debuted January 9, 2016. The revival is hosted by Paul Peck and local pro bowler Sue Nawojski.
Off Beat Cinema, the long-running hosted movie series formerly aired on WKBW-TV (and carried by WNGS as a secondary station since 2006), moved to WBBZ-TV on August 4, 2012. New programs are being produced before a live audience for the first time. WBBZ-TV airs Off Beat Cinema in a double feature with Svengoolie, the hosted movie series that MeTV carries each Saturday night. Its hosts are Tony "Bird" Billoni, Constance "Zelda" Caldwell, and Jeffrey "Theodore" Roberts.
The Big Picture is the current incarnation of WBBZ's public affairs/weekend talk show. It traces its roots to Political Buzz, the first local program to originate from the WBBZ-TV studios, which debuted on June 21, 2012. It was hosted for most of its run by former WIVB news anchor Mylous Hairston. It ended in late 2014 and was replaced in January 2015 with Talk of the Town, a more generally oriented talk show hosted by Kim Piazza and WBBZ owner Phil Arno. Talk of the Town ended when Daily Buzz 716 launched. The Big Picture, hosted by Arno, debuted in June 2018. As of 2021, two episodes air weekly, one on Monday nights hosted by Arno, and another hosted by Penny Wolfgang, a local judge and media personality.

All of these programs can be seen by an audience; reservations are suggested on the station's website. Additional airings with the exception of Off Beat Cinema take place, usually twice, shortly after the original airing.

Previous local programming
America's Car Show was a television version of the then-syndicated radio series hosted by Chautauqua County, New York native Tom Torbjornsen. It debuted on September 12, 2012, and, for its first few months on air, aired in conjunction with Entertainment Studios' cars.tv. After a move to Saturday mornings, the show quietly ended its run after several months of reruns in early 2014. Torbjornsen died in 2016. A potential revival of the concept, Drive with Me TV, with Dave Jickster and Lauren Fix as hosts, will air a pilot episode February 20, 2019.
Dyngus Day Diary aired on April 1, 2013, and summarized the Buffalo Dyngus Day parade that had been held earlier in the day. Subsequent episodes moved to WKBW-TV.
Buffalo Night in America – This live three-hour broadcast was made available worldwide on Ustream, on July 21, 2012. The broadcast included live streaming video from various parties around the United States and various forms of variety entertainment centered around Western New York culture. Although the special was a critical, technical and ratings failure, management of the station attributed its failure to being too ambitious, too soon, and considered the making of the special a learning experience.
The Healthy Zone Game Show, the station's second game show offering, was produced in conjunction with Blue Cross Blue Shield of Western New York. The contestants were elementary school students chosen from Buffalo Public Schools. This series ran from November 30, 2015, through June 19, 2016, and was recorded at Kleinhans Music Hall; according to WBBZ's Web site, no further seasons are planned.
Daily Buzz 716 was a female-oriented daily panel talk show in the mold of The View and The Talk. The show's rotating panelist included Penny Wolfgang, Kim Piazza, Adriana Viverette-Gamble, Constance Caldwell, Mercedes Wilson, Lauren Fix, Mary Kate O'Connell (sister of Kevin O'Connell) and Mary Arno. The program debuted March 1, 2017, and was quietly canceled some time before May 2018.
Bragging Rights!, a game show which (as the title implies) has no cash prize, debuted June 9, 2014. The show pits two teams of three people with some common bond, ranging from local celebrities to common families, against each other in an interactive trivia contest loosely based on tic-tac-toe. The show was created by Arno and is hosted by John DiSciullo. The first season, which aired new episodes five days a week, ended in September 2014; production resumed as a weekly show in February 2015 and eventually returned to daily episodes. Bragging Rights! was pulled from the schedule in March 2020.

Sports
From 2011 to 2015, WBBZ-TV carried a number of sports broadcasts and sports-related programs, a genre the station has since abandoned.

WBBZ-TV held rights to the package of New York Yankees games produced for broadcast syndication by WWOR-TV from 2011 until 2013; a bulk syndication agreement with Sinclair Broadcast Group, coupled with increased rights fees and declining ratings, led to WBBZ-TV dropping the Yankees broadcasts for the 2014 season. As RTN11, WNGS carried Yankees, New York Mets and Cleveland Indians games.

WBBZ-TV announced the acquisition of the rights to a Thursday Night Football broadcast featuring the Buffalo Bills during the 2012 season, following an "aggressive" bidding process; those rights had previously resided with WKBW-TV. WBBZ-TV had made the bid in part because as it stood, the station would be the only place on Time Warner Cable that viewers could see the game (NFL Network was not available on Time Warner Cable at the time of the bid), but Time Warner Cable and NFL Network signed a carriage agreement during the course of the 2012 season, rendering the advantage moot. WBBZ-TV again won the rights to the NFL Network Bills game in 2013, with a lower bid than the year before but one that was still much higher than the other stations had offered. Due to Thursday Night Football broadcast rights moving exclusively to CBS affiliates in 2014, and the fact that the Bills were not selected for any Monday Night Football games that year, no games were made available to any local stations. WBBZ lost the rights to the Bills' lone cable game for 2015 to WKBW-TV. (During WNGS's time under WKBW management, the station carried replays of Bills preseason games.)

During a prolonged contract dispute between MSG Network and Time Warner Cable, WBBZ-TV proposed buying the rights to Buffalo Sabres games from MSG in order for Time Warner Cable subscribers to see the game. The two sides came to an agreement before any action could be taken on Arno's proposal.

In August 2013, WBBZ-TV announced it had affiliated with Raycom Sports's ACC Network to carry the syndicated Atlantic Coast Conference Saturday package of college football and college basketball games starting with the 2013 season, when Syracuse University joined the conference; WBBZ-TV emphasizes games involving Syracuse and the University of Pittsburgh. WBBZ lost the ACC package to WNLO in 2015, leaving the station without any live sports play-by-play.

WBBZ aired an NBA on ABC game on March 5, 2016; the usual ABC affiliate, WKBW, broadcast its annual telethon for Variety, the Children's Charity that day. The station also served as an overflow for a Little League World Series broadcast that was preempted on WKBW for a Bills preseason game on August 20.

The station also carried a number of sports-related half-hour shows.

As RTN11, WNGS aired Sportsnite, a production of WKBW-TV's sports department, from 2006 to 2007. Niagara University later took a stake in the program and it became known as Sportsnite Niagara, airing only during the winter months, until WNGS shut down in 2009.
The Bucky and Sully Show debuted on WBBZ on September 6, 2013. Produced in partnership with The Buffalo News featuring the News sports columnists, Jerry Sullivan and Bucky Gleason; it aired new episodes twice weekly on Monday and Friday from September through May, with its last WBBZ episode airing in May 2015. The show had previously aired exclusively on The Buffalo News's Web site; Sullivan and Gleason would later go on to co-host Sports Talk Sunday for WGRZ in fall 2015 and would reunite with Bob Koshinski for a show on radio station WHLD in January 2016.
All Sports WNY (originally known as Sports Rap-Up until May 21, 2013), a weekly sports summary and talk/interview show, was hosted by Bob Koshinski and aired on Tuesday evenings from September 11, 2012 until an unknown point in summer 2015. Luke Tasker, wide receiver for the Hamilton Tiger-Cats and son of former Buffalo Bills wide receiver Steve Tasker, was a correspondent for the program.
For five seasons, WBBZ aired a weekly Buffalo Bills recap and audience-participation talk show during football season. The first three seasons. spanning 2012 to 2014, were hosted by Bob Koshinski and Fred Jackson and were thus known as The Fred Jackson Show. Seasons four and five were hosted by Robert Woods and WGRF disc jockey Dave Jickster; season four aired as In the Zone and season five aired as The Robert Woods Show. The series was quietly dropped after Woods left for the Los Angeles Rams prior to the 2017 season.

Specials
WBBZ-TV will take over airing the Variety Kids Telethon, previously a staple of WKBW's lineup since 1962, in 2020. WBBZ-TV will share the broadcast with WGRZ.
WBBZ-TV airs an annual presentation of the Yule Log each Christmas Day. Bob Koshinski had brought this feature over from Empire Sports Network, where he had used the presentation each Christmas; it has continued on WBBZ under Chris Musial.
Giants of Buffalo – A recurring series of documentary/interview specials documenting Buffalo history. The first one, Radio, was taped in March 2013 and debuted on May 26 of that year at 10:00 p.m. Television and Journalism were taped in March and April 2014, respectively; Television debuts in two parts, May 19, and May 20, 2014. Women of Buffalo Television debuts May 22, 2014. Journalism debuted January 1, 2015. "Food" will be recorded April 17, 2015.
The Buffalo Broadcasters Association Hall of Fame induction ceremonies aired on WBBZ-TV December 28, 2016.
Gifts from the Heart, a Thanksgiving special, aired November 23, 2017 at 8:00 p.m.
WBBZ-TV's first made-for-TV movie, the Greg Robbins-directed holiday comedy Hope for Christmas, debuted December 2, 2018.
WBBZ-TV re-aired the 2018 film WKBW Radio's War of the Worlds: 50 Years Later, produced by former general manager Bob Koshinski and originally broadcast on WNED-TV, in October 2019. It was retitled WKBW Radio's War of the Worlds: The Legacy Continues for television airings.

This does not include special episodes of The Big Picture and What's the Buzz in WNY? that break from their respective formats. Other specials are in the works.

Other programming

As of September 2017, WBBZ-TV no longer carries any syndicated programming, except for the Entertainment Studios productions cars.tv and  Career Day, both of which air once a week on Saturday mornings. (Most of Entertainment Studios' other programs air on WKBW.)
The Daily Buzz was carried during the 2011–12 season, but was removed after the producers of that show cut back and revamped the format; other shows WBBZ-TV previously carried include Cash Cab (2011–14), The Rocky and Bullwinkle Show (summer 2013), The Addams Family (August 2013), Beer Geeks and That '70s Show (both during the 2013–14 season), King of the Hill (2013–15), and The King of Queens (2014–17). Supreme Justice with Judge Karen and Justice with Judge Mablean both moved to WNLO in 2017 after airing on WBBZ for several years. The remaining programming on the station comes from MeTV and infomercials. In contrast to the station's competitors, who broadcast a liberal number of infomercials during the overnight hours, WBBZ-TV airs its infomercials on weekday mornings instead, which varies from one to three hours and pre-empts MeTV's non-E/I children's programs. WBBZ-TV also preempts large portions of MeTV's weekend lineup for infomercials.

The station added a locally originated home shopping block in July 2019.

Ratings

WBBZ-TV's programming to date has proven competitive with other stations in the market, having finished in a near statistical tie with WNLO and WNYO-TV in the Nielsen ratings for the November 2011 sweeps; this is despite the fact that both of those stations had local newscasts at the time (a particular ratings boost to WNLO; WNYO-TV lost its local newscast to sister station WUTV (channel 29) in April 2013), whereas WBBZ-TV does not. However, by summer 2012, ratings had fallen to a third of their 2011 highs. The ratings later rebounded in November 2012. As of the May 2014 sweeps, WBBZ-TV is earning approximately a 2.0 Nielsen rating for its prime-time MeTV offerings and a 1.0 rating for its original productions. Arno hopes to move into fourth place in the all-day Nielsen ratings (to which he does not subscribe, instead opting to use the services of Rentrak, a competing service but realistically expects to eventually reach fifth, ahead of WNYO-TV and WNLO.
Financially speaking, WBBZ's local programs have been profitable enough for Arno to invest more money into the station's studios. Arno had hoped to sell the station's spectrum in the FCC's spectrum incentive auction in 2017 (which would have presumably resulted in WBBZ entering a channel-sharing agreement with another Buffalo market station if successful). Because the station was already in the high-VHF band and most interested parties sought UHF channels, WBBZ-TV's spectrum went unsold.

Technical information

Subchannels
The station's digital signal is multiplexed:

On March 1, 2017, Heroes & Icons replaced This TV on the 67.2 subchannel. Dabl was added on the 67.5 subchannel in September 2019.

Start TV, Decades and Movies!, three other digital subchannel networks owned (like MeTV) by Weigel Broadcasting, were added July 1, 2020. Decades and Movies! had previously been on WVTT-CD until that channel left the air.

References

External links

WBBZ-TV Program schedule from Locate TV
Official Facebook page

1997 establishments in New York (state)
Equity Media Holdings
Heroes & Icons affiliates
MeTV affiliates
Daystar (TV network) affiliates
Dabl affiliates
Start TV affiliates
Decades (TV network) affiliates
Movies! affiliates
Television channels and stations established in 1997
BBZ-TV